Anolis capito, the bighead anole, is a species of lizard in the family Dactyloidae. The species is found in Mexico, Guatemala, Belize, Honduras, Nicaragua, Costa Rica, and Panama.

References

Anoles
Reptiles described in 1863
Taxa named by Wilhelm Peters